Gitgit Waterfall is a waterfall on Bali, Indonesia. It is located on the north of the Southeast Asian island between the old island capital of Singaraja and the inland village of Munduk. The waterfall is a popular tourist destination in Bali, known for its height and the surrounding foliage and natural swimming pools, accessible by a rocky walking trail.

See also 
 List of waterfalls

References

External links
 

Landforms of Bali
Waterfalls of Indonesia
Tourist attractions in Bali